The Robert A. Thompson House is located along NY 302 in the Thompson Ridge section of the Orange County, New York, town of Crawford. It was built in 1822 in the Federal style. One of the stones in the northwest cable bears his initials and that date.  His descendants established the Dutch-Belt dairy farm, which still operates.

The home was added to the National Register of Historic Places in 1998.

References

Houses on the National Register of Historic Places in New York (state)
Houses in Orange County, New York
National Register of Historic Places in Orange County, New York
Houses completed in 1822
Federal architecture in New York (state)
1822 establishments in New York (state)